Aşiyan is a underground station and the eastern terminus of the F4 funicular line of the Istanbul Metro in Beşiktaş, Istanbul. The station is located next to the Aşiyan Park, along Cevdet Paşa Avenue on the Bosphorus strait in Bebek. The station opened on 28 October, 2022.

References

Istanbul metro stations
Beşiktaş
Rapid transit stations under construction in Turkey

Railway stations in Turkey opened in 2022